The United States Senate election of 1916 in New York was held on November 7, 1916. Incumbent Democratic Senator James O'Gorman chose not to seek re-election. Republican William M. Calder was elected to a succeed O'Gorman, defeating Democrat William F. McCombs.

Democratic primary

Candidates
 Thomas F. Conway, former Lieutenant Governor of New York
 William F. McCombs, Chairman of the Democratic National Committee

Results

Republican primary

Candidates
 Robert Bacon, former United States Secretary of State and Ambassador to France (also running as American)
 William M. Calder, former U.S. Representative from Brooklyn and candidate for Senate in 1914 (also running as Progressive)

Results

Progressive primary

Candidates
 William M. Calder, former U.S. Representative from Brooklyn (also running as Republican)
 Bainbridge Colby, former State Assemblyman and nominee for Senate in 1914

Results

General election

Candidates
 William M. Calder, former U.S. Representative and candidate for Senate in 1914 (Republican)
 Bainbridge Colby, former member of the New York Assembly and candidate for Senate in 1914 (Progressive)
 D. Leigh Colvin, attorney (Prohibition)
 Joseph D. Cannon, organizer for Metal Workers' Union (Socialist)
 August Gillhaus, nominee for U.S. President in 1908 (Socialist Labor)
 William F. McCombs, Chairman of the Democratic National Committee (Democratic and American)

The American Party initially nominated Robert Bacon, but following his defeat in the Republican primary, he withdrew. In his place, the Americans substituted Democratic nominee William F. McCombs.

Results

References

1916
New York
1916 New York (state) elections